The women's freestyle 72 kilograms is a competition featured at the 2008 World Wrestling Championships, and was held at the Yoyogi National Gymnasium in Tokyo, Japan on 13 October.

This freestyle wrestling competition consisted of a single-elimination tournament, with a repechage used to determine the winner of two bronze medals. The two finalists faced off for gold and silver medals. Each wrestler who lost to one of the two finalists moved into the repechage, culminating in a pair of bronze medal matches featuring the semifinal losers each facing the remaining repechage opponent from their half of the bracket.

Each bout consisted of up to three rounds, lasting two minutes apiece. The wrestler who scored more points in each round was the winner of that rounds; the bout finished when one wrestler had won two rounds (and thus the match).

Results
Legend
F — Won by fall
R — Retired

Main bracket

Repechage

References

Women's freestyle 72 kg